Forrester Island is an ice-capped island  long that lies  north-northeast of Shepard Island, off the Getz Ice Shelf of Marie Byrd Land, Antarctica. The island was discovered and charted from the USS Glacier on 5 February 1962, and was named by the Advisory Committee on Antarctic Names after Lieutenant Commander John J. Forrester, U.S. Navy, Executive Officer aboard the Glacier at the time of discovery.

See also 
 List of Antarctic and sub-Antarctic islands
 Reynolds Strait

References 

Islands of Marie Byrd Land